Abdulla Alxazoviç Abatsiyev (16 August 1993) is an Azerbaijani football midfielder and junior coach. He also holds Russian citizenship.

Club career
Abatsiyev signed with FC Torpedo Armavir on 26 February 2016.

International career
Abatsiyev played his first international game with the national team on 27 May 2014, in a friendly in and against United States where he was named in the starting line-up and played 71 minutes.

References

External links
 
 

1993 births
Sportspeople from Vladikavkaz
Living people
Azerbaijani footballers
Azerbaijan youth international footballers
Azerbaijan under-21 international footballers
Azerbaijan international footballers
Russian footballers
Association football midfielders
Sumgayit FK players
Shamakhi FK players
FC Armavir players
FC Spartak Vladikavkaz players
FC SKA Rostov-on-Don players
Azerbaijan Premier League players
Russian First League players
Russian Second League players
FC Mashuk-KMV Pyatigorsk players